Colonel Fiennes Stanley Wykeham Cornwallis, 1st Baron Cornwallis,  (27 May 1864 – 26 September 1935) was a British Conservative politician.

Early life
Lord Cornwallis was born 27 May 1864 at Chacombe Priory, Banbury, Oxfordshire, the eldest son of Fiennes Cornwallis and Harriet Elizabeth (née Mott). He had one brother and two sisters and was educated at Eton College.

Political career
He was elected to the House of Commons as Member of Parliament for Maidstone in 1888, a seat he held until 1895 and again from 1898 to 1900. He was also chairman of the Kent County Council between 1910 and 1930. In 1927 he was raised to the peerage as Baron Cornwallis, of Linton in the County of Kent, where his country house, Linton Park, was situated.

He was appointed Honorary Colonel of the Thames and Medway Heavy Brigade, Royal Artillery, on 11 March 1933.

Family life
Lord Cornwallis married Mabel Leigh, daughter of Oswald Peter Leigh, in 1886. They had seven children, three sons and four daughters.

Fiennes Wykeham Mann Cornwallis was killed in Ireland in May 1921 during the Irish War of Independence. Lord Cornwallis was succeeded in the barony by his second son, Wykeham Stanley. Lady Cornwallis died in 1957.

Cornwallis was the grandson of Charles Wykeham Martin and great-grandson of James Mann, 5th Earl Cornwallis.

Freemasonry
He was an eminent Freemason and was Provincial Grand Master of Kent and a Past Grand Warden  in the United Grand Lodge of England. Stanley Wykeham Lodge 6599  was named for him.

Bibliography
Kidd, Charles; Williamson, David (editors). Debrett's Peerage and Baronetage (1990 edition). New York: St Martin's Press, 1990.

Notes

References

The Descendants of William the Conqueror Page 104
Lippincott's Magazine of Popular Literature and Science The Conwallis Family
Province of East Kent History of our Province

External links 
 

1864 births
1935 deaths
People educated at Eton College
Conservative Party (UK) MPs for English constituencies
English justices of the peace
UK MPs 1886–1892
UK MPs 1892–1895
UK MPs 1895–1900
UK MPs who were granted peerages
People from Banbury
Military personnel from Oxfordshire
Queen's Own West Kent Yeomanry officers
Commanders of the Order of the British Empire
Deputy Lieutenants of Kent
Fiennes
Barons created by George V
Barons Cornwallis